The Armenian National Badminton Championships is a tournament organized to crown the best badminton players in Armenia. They are held since the season 1996/1997.

Past winners

Junior championships

References
Badminton Europe - Details of affiliated national organisations: Armenia

Badminton in Armenia
National badminton championships
Badminton
Recurring sporting events established in 1996